Mechta-Afalou (Mechtoid) or Paleo-Berber are a population that inhabited parts of North Africa during the late Paleolithic and Mesolithic. They are associated with the Iberomaurusian archaeological culture.

Bioanthropology

Mechtoids are believed to have been assimilated during the Neolithic and early Bronze Age by the makers of the ensuing Capsian culture. Craniometric analysis by Sereno et al. (2008) indicates that Iberomaurusians were closely related to the early Holocene Capsians of the Maghreb (Tamazgha), as well as the early Holocene Kiffians of the Sahara. Dental analysis by Irish (2016) indicates that Kiffian populations had close phenetic affinity with West African and Bantu-speaking populations.

Genetics

Iberomaurusian fossils excavated at the Afalou site were found to carry the mtDNA haplogroups H or U (3/9; 33%), J (2/9; 22%), H103 (1/9; 11%), H14b1 or JT (1/9; 11%), R0a1a (1/9; 11%), and T2b (1/9; 11%). All of these are Eurasian Haplogroups.

Iberomaurusian fossils excavated at the Taforalt site were found to carry the Y-DNA haplogroups E-M78* (4/6; 66%), E-L618* (1/6; 16%), and E-M35 (1/6; 16%). All individuals carried the mtDNA haplogroups U6 (6/7; 85%) and M1 (1/7; 14%).

Loosdrecht et al. (2018) analysed genome-wide data from seven ancient individuals from the Iberomaurusian Grotte des Pigeons site near Taforalt in north-eastern Morocco. The fossils were directly dated to between 15,100 and 13,900 calibrated years before present. The scientists found that all males belonged to haplogroup E1b1b, common among Afroasiatic males. The male specimens with sufficient nuclear DNA preservation belonged to the paternal haplogroup E1b1b1a1 (M78), with one skeleton bearing the E1b1b1a1b1 parent lineage to E-V13, one male specimen belonged to E1b1b (M215*). These Y-DNA clades, 24,000 years BP, had a common ancestor with the Berbers and the E1b1b1b (M123) subhaplogroup that has been observed in skeletal remains belonging to the Epipaleolithic Natufian and Pre-Pottery Neolithic cultures of the Levant. Maternally, the Taforalt remains bore the U6a and M1b mtDNA haplogroups, which are common among modern Afroasiatic-speaking populations in Africa. A two-way admixture scenario using Natufian and modern sub-Saharan samples (including West African and East African samples) as reference populations inferred that the seven Taforalt individuals are modeled genetically as of 63.5% Natufian-related and 36.5% "sub-Saharan" African ancestry (with the latter having both West African-like and East African-like affinities), with no apparent gene flow from the Epigravettian culture of Paleolithic southern Europe however this model totally failed and was proven wrong in the same aforementionned study. Laziridis 2018 showed Iberomaurisians derived their lineage from a unique population called Ancestral North African (ANA), this ancestral population also contributed 13% ancestry into Mesolithic Natufians of the Levant , as well as a minor 12,5% Iberomaurisian-like gene flow into Modern West Africans (best proxied by Yoruba) The scientists indicated that further ancient DNA testing at other Iberomaurusian archaeological sites would be necessary to determine whether the Taforalt samples were representative of the broader Iberomaurusian gene pool. The Sub-Saharan African ancestry of the Taforalt population is indicated to be drawn out, most of all, by West Africans (e.g., Yoruba, Mende). Jeong (2020) indicated that the Sub-Saharan African DNA of the Taforalt population has similarity with the remnant of a more basal Sub-Saharan African lineage (e.g., a basal West African lineage shared between Yoruba and Mende peoples). Additionally, the Sub-Saharan African DNA in the Taforalt population may be best represented by modern West Africans (e.g., Yoruba).

Language

MacDonald (2003) states: "When one considers the African populations of the Terminal Pleistocene, the seemingly unified physical type of those dwelling in North African refugia (i.e. Mechtoids) and their eventual cultural assimilation of contemporary populations living in West African coast refugia, then language homelands for Niger-Congo and Nilo-Saharan between the Maghreb and the Nile Valley are strongly suggested. Further, in light of the Niger-Saharan macro-phylum hypothesis (Blench, Volume III and 1995c), a sort of unity for Niger-Saharan speakers would seem likely during the Late and Terminal Pleistocene (c. 20,000–12,000 BP)…In essence, a ‘Niger-Saharan’ model, from an archaeological perspective, would progress as follows. Proto-Niger-Saharan speakers may be represented by the post-Aterian, Mechtoid refuge populations of the North African littoral and highlands (c. 20,000 BP). Language diversification would have accelerated when populations began to expand into the Sahara from North African refugia at the beginning of the Holocene (12,000–10,000 BP)."

Blench (2019) states: "The linguistic affiliation of the North African forager populations who came south is difficult to establish as they probably represented a language phylum or phyla now vanished…These populations are called ‘Paleoberber’ in the literature, but there is no evidence they spoke a language in any way connected with modern Berber…Prior to the expansion of Berber and then Arabic, unknown but distinct languages would have been spoken in both the Sahara and along the North African coast…these languages can be referred to as ‘Old North African’ (ONA) with no presuppositions as to their genetic affiliation(s). It is possible they were related to the former languages of the Iberian Peninsula, such as Tartessian. Archaeologically, these must be identified with the Capsian and its predecessors, although the languages spoken in the first period of the Neolithic in the Maghrib would also have been ONA. But the completeness with which Berber eliminated ONA means little can be said about it. The Berber roots which are not of Afroasiatic origin may reflect these languages, or simply the long period of differentiation from the mainstream of the Afroasiatic lexicon."

See also

 Tenerian culture

References

External links

Antropologia Fisica
Etnia Guanche
Migration of Mechta-Afalou people (a.k.a. Ouchtatiens), marked light green on the map

History of North Africa
History of the Sahara
Ancient peoples of Africa